The AWA British Empire Heavyweight Championship was a short-lived mid-card professional wrestling title contested for in the American Wrestling Association promotion between 1969 and 1979. The title was primarily defended in Canada, hence the British Empire name.

Title history

Footnotes

References

External links
Wrestling Information Archive

American Wrestling Association championships
Heavyweight wrestling championships
National professional wrestling championships